Prinzregentenplatz is an U-Bahn station in Munich on the U4.

The Prinzregentenplatz is a located in Bogenhausen. It was named after Prince Regent of Bavaria.

References

External links

Munich U-Bahn stations
Railway stations in Germany opened in 1988
1988 establishments in West Germany